Ibrahim Shaibu Atadoga was a Nigerian lawyer who served as the president of Kogi State Customary Court of Appeal.

Early life and career
Shaibu Atadoga was from Omala, Kogi State, Nigeria. He was called to the Nigerian bar in 1986. He became the president of Kogi State Customary Court of Appeal after Samuel Otta retired. On 8 July 2020, Bayo Olusegun replaced Atadoga as the president of Kogi State Customary Court of Appeal, but in acting capacity.

Death
Atadoga died on 21 June 2020.

References

20th-century births
2020 deaths
People from Kogi State
Kogi State judges
Presidents of Kogi State Customary Court of Appeal